Cake is a Nollywood romantic comedy film directed by Prosper Edesiri and produced by Tongryang Pantu. It stars Saskay, Patience Ozokwor, Emmanuel Jibunor, Philip Asaya, Tope Tedela, Sophie Alakija, Folu Storms with  Dotun Olakunri as the Executive Producer and also Steve Gukas Co-producer of the film. It was released through Natives Filmworks and Michelangelo Productions on the Natives Family Friendly Films Project Production Company. The film was distributed through FilmOne Production and was theatrically released on 25 February 2022.

Cast 
 Saskay
 Patience Ozokwor
 Emmanuel Jibunor
 Philip Asaya
 Tope Tedela
 Sophie Alakija
 Folu Storms

References 

Nigerian romantic comedy films
2022 films
2022 romantic comedy films
English-language Nigerian films
2020s English-language films